Pomiferin is a prenylated isoflavone that can be found along with osajin in the fruits and female flowers of the osage orange tree (Maclura pomifera).

Pomiferin was identified and named in 1939 by Melville L. Wolfrom from Ohio State University. In 1941, Wolfram classified pomiferin as an isoflavone and in 1946 published the complete structure of Pomiferin. In 2003 the crystal structure of pomiferin (3-(3,4-dihydroxyphenyl)-5-hydroxy-8,8-dimethyl-6-(3-methylbut-2-enyl)-4H,8H-pyrano[2,3-h]chromen-4-one), C25H24O6 was reported by J. Marek.

In recent research Pomiferin has demonstrated efficacy as an antioxidant, cardioprotectant, antimicrobial, antidiabetic, PDE5 inhibitor and cytotoxicity for several cancer cell lines.

Research

Repellent
Peterson and Fristad (2000) investigated folklore beliefs stating that osage orange fruit repelled insects. They concluded that pure pomiferin had little or no effect and that there must be another component of the Osage orange that repels insects.

Antioxidant
Pomiferin has shown antioxidant activity via inhibition of lipid peroxidation and the reduction of free radicals, reactive oxygen species and other unstable molecules. Tsao and Yang (2003) reported that Pomiferin was found to be a strong antioxidant, comparable to the vitamins C and E and the synthetic antioxidant BHT.

Cardioprotectant
Necas and Bartosíková (2007) reported that the chemical had potent cardioprotective effect on rat hearts subjected to ischemia and reperfusion injury. The mechanism for this protection may occur through the inhibition of lipid peroxidation.

Antimicrobial
Mahmoud (1981) indicated that pomiferin exhibited antibacterial activity against E. coli and Salmonella gallinarum, as well as Mycobacterium smegmatis to a lesser extent.

Antidiabetic
Bartosíková and Necas (2007), furthermore, conducted a biochemical examination showing antioxidative and antidiabetic effects of pomiferin.

Moon (2014) presented results of a study that evaluated the antidiabetic effect of osajin and pomiferin from the Osage orange in normal and streptozotocin-induced diabetic rats. Pomiferin in the streptozotocin-induced diabetic rats resulted in significant hypoglycemic activity for 14 days following, by decreased the serum glucose and triglycerides while increasing serum insulin in those rats.

PDE5 inhibitor
Ribaudo (2015) proposed pomiferin and osajin as potential lead compounds for the development, starting from natural scaffolds, of a new class of PDE-5A inhibitors with vasorelaxant properties to treat pulmonary hypertension and erectile dysfunction.

Anti-cancer activity
Svasti (2005) observed that pomiferin induced apoptosis and differentiation in cholangiocarcinoma cell line HuCCA-1.

Son (2007) investigated the growth-inhibitory activity of pomiferin compared to SAHA (suberoylanilide hydroxamic acid). Pomiferin exhibited cytotoxicity effects on six cancer cells lines: Kidney (ACHN), Lung (NCI-H23), Prostate (PC-3), Breast (MDA-MB-231), Melanoma (LOX-IMVI) and Colon (HCT-15).

References

Further reading

Isoflavones